Adolph VI, Count of Holstein-Schauenburg (1256–1315) was the ruling Count of Holstein-Pinneberg and Schaumburg from 1290 until his death.  He was the third son of Gerhard I and Elisabeth of Mecklenburg and was married to Helen of Saxe-Lauenburg, daughter of John I, Duke of Saxony.

Reign
When Gerhard I died in 1290, his sons divided the inheritance.  Adolph VI received Holstein-Pinneberg and the ancestral County of Schaumburg.  Adolph is considered the founder of the younger Schauenburg line; his brothers founded the Holstein-Plön and Holstein-Rendsburg lines.

In 1298, he granted a charter to the city of Gehrden.  In 1302, he began construction of the water castle at Bückeburg to defend the main trade route.  The castle was named after a castle in the Obernkirchen area; the name was first mentioned in a document in 1304.

Seal
His seal (see picture) reads:

"Seal of Adolph, Count of Schauenburg"

Footnotes

House of Schauenburg
1256 births
1315 deaths
Counts of Holstein